Hakaufasi is sand cay in Tonga. It is located within the Vava'u Group in the far north of the country.

References

Islands of Tonga
Vavaʻu